Celebration is a remix album credited to United DJ's vs. Pandora. The album contains new remixes of some of Pandora's biggest hits. The album was released worldwide in November 2007 and spawned four top 10 singles in Sweden.

Track listing 
 "On a Night Like This" (JS16 L8 Nite Radio Edit) – 6:10
 "One of a Kind" (Koyra's Electro Mix) – 3:28
 "One of Us" (Vinylshakerz 101 Mix) – 5:52
 "The Naked Sun" (Desert Heave Rock Mix) – 4:06
 "Come On And Do It" (Playmaker's Do It Mix) – 3:21
 "Tell the World" (Pitchtunes Vs. Playmaker Radio Edit) – 3:09
 "Trust Me" (Vasco & Millboy Radio Edit)  – 3:47
 "Don't You Know" (Soundcruiser's Radio Edit)  – 3:42
 "Don't Worry" (Worry Free Mix)  – 5:08
 "The Sands of Time" (Flamenco Edit) – 3:25
 "On a Night Like This" (Playmaker's Mix)  – 3:41
 "Come On and Do It" (JS16 Do It Mix)  – 5:35
 "Don't Worry" (Blue House Effect in Effect Mix) – 5:54
 "Don't You Know" (Magic Mitch & DJ Nico Reagaton Mix) – 7:21
 "Tell the World" (Groove Maniax Casablanca Edit) – 3:17
 "Trust Me" (Vasco & Millboy Extended) – 6:11

Charts

Release history

References 

2007 remix albums
Pandora (singer) albums
Capitol Records albums